Mount Sinyella is a 5,441-foot-elevation (1,658 meter) summit located in the western end of Grand Canyon National Park, in Coconino County of northern Arizona, US. As the high point of Sinyella Mesa, it towers 1,200 feet above the mesa, and 3,600 feet above the nearby Colorado River which is 1.5 mile to the northwest.

This isolated butte is an erosional remnant composed of Permian Kaibab Limestone and Coconino Sandstone. This sandstone, which is the third-youngest stratum in the Grand Canyon, was deposited 265 million years ago as sand dunes. According to the Köppen climate classification system, Mount Sinyella is located in a Cold semi-arid climate zone.

History

This butte's name was adopted as Mount Sinyala in 1932 by the U.S. Board on Geographic Names. In 1988, the board officially revised it to the present spelling, Sinyella. It was named by the American conservationist Charles Sheldon for Judge Sinyella (1853–1923), a prominent Havasupai chief who Sheldon hired as a guide to show him the canyon in 1912. "It is interesting to go with him [Sinyala], he knows every foot of the country" noted Sheldon. The local native inhabitants called it "Week-eel-eela" which is said to mean "stick sitting up", also their general term for any butte.

The first ascent of the summit was made April 11, 1960, by Don Myers, Mike Sherrick, Jim Wilkerson, and Bill Amborn via the north face. The second ascent was made by Dave Ganci and Jerry Robertson, May 3, 1969.

Gallery

See also
 Geology of the Grand Canyon area
 History of the Grand Canyon area
 Paguekwash Point
 Fishtail Mesa

References

External links 

 Weather forecast: National Weather Service
 Mt. Sinyella photo from river level
 Mount Sinyella pronunciation

Grand Canyon
Buttes of Arizona
Landforms of Coconino County, Arizona
Colorado Plateau
Grand Canyon National Park
North American 1000 m summits
Sandstone formations of the United States
Grand Canyon, South Rim
Grand Canyon, South Rim (west)